Carolina Moon is a 2007 American television film directed by Stephen Tolkin and starring Claire Forlani and Oliver Hudson. Based on the 2000 Nora Roberts novel Carolina Moon, the film is about a woman with psychic visions who returns to her hometown to exorcise her demons and finds both danger and love. Carolina Moon is part of the Nora Roberts 2007 movie collection, which also includes Angels Fall, Blue Smoke, and Montana Sky. The movie debuted February 19, 2007 on Lifetime Television.

Plot
Young Tory Bodeen (Forlani) is blessed - or maybe cursed - with clairvoyance. Her childhood best friend, Hope, is murdered and she leaves town. Years later she returns to open a retail store. Tory's father, an abusive religious fanatic and ex-con remains the prime suspect in the unsolved murder. Her mother is a weak enabler, believing her husband is a good man, and that Tory is evil due to her paranormal abilities.

As the anniversary of Hope's death approaches, Tory resolves to face her demons, with the help of her childhood friends—Tory's cousin Wade (Willett), Hope's twin sister Faith (Davis), and the twins' older brother Cade (Hudson), who realizes his childhood crush on Tory hasn't ended. Will her friends be enough to save Tory?

Cast
 Claire Forlani as Victoria 'Tory' Bodeen
 Oliver Hudson as Cade Lavelle
 Josie Davis as Faith Lavelle
 Jonathan Scarfe as Dwight Collier
 Chad Willett as Wade Mooney
 Jacqueline Bisset as Margaret Lavelle
 Shaun Johnston as Han Bodeen
 Greg Lawson as Police Chief Carl Russ
 Gabrielle Casha as Young Tory Bodeen
 Kade Phillips as Young Cade Lavelle
 Shae Keebler as Young Faith Lavelle/Hope Lavalle
 Taison Gelinas as Young Dwight Collier
 Connor Robinson as Young Wade Mooney

Production
The film was executive produced by Stephanie Germain and Peter Guber, who also 'e.p.-ed' seven other Roberts films for Lifetime in 2007 and 2009.

References

External links
 
 
 
 

2007 television films
2007 films
2007 romantic drama films
Films based on American novels
Films based on romance novels
Films based on works by Nora Roberts
Films set in North Carolina
Lifetime (TV network) films
American romantic drama films
American thriller television films
American romantic thriller films
Films scored by Steve Porcaro
Films with screenplays by Stephen Tolkin
American drama television films
2000s English-language films
2000s American films